Brockville was a federal electoral district in Ontario, Canada, that was represented in the House of Commons of Canada from 1867 to 1917.  It was created by the British North America Act of 1867.

It consisted initially of the Town of Brockville and the Township of Elizabethtown. In 1882, the township of Kitley was added to the riding. In 1903, the township of Kitley was removed from the riding, and the townships of Yonge and Escott (Front and Rear), and the village of Athens were added.

The electoral district was abolished in 1914 when it was merged into Leeds ridings.

Election results

On Mr. Wood's nomination as Controller of Inland Revenue, 5 December 1892:

On Mr. Wood's death, 14 March 1899:

On Mr. Derbyshire's resignation, 30 August 1907:

See also 

 List of Canadian federal electoral districts
 Past Canadian electoral districts

References

External links 
Riding history from the Library of Parliament

Former federal electoral districts of Ontario